A list of films released in Japan in 1988 (see 1988 in film).

See also 
 1988 in Japan
 1988 in Japanese television

References

Footnotes

Sources

External links
 Japanese films of 1988 at the Internet Movie Database

1988
Japanese
Films